The forêt de Brotonne (Brotonne forest), in France, is situated to the west of Rouen in a vast meander of the Seine, accessible by the pont de Brotonne.  It is a part of the Parc naturel régional des Boucles de la Seine normande (Regional natural parc of Boucles de la Seine normande), which allows for the safeguarding of a large natural space stretching from the banlieue of Rouen to the commune of Marais-Vernier.

It contains more than ninety species of trees, notably oaks and beech. The forest is one of the largest beech forests in France, with 62% of its area of its surface covered in beech. In addition to beech and oaks, the forest also contains Scots Pines and Hornbeams.
In addition to the trees, the forest also contains a windmill (the moulin-tour de Hauville) and a communal cottage (four à pain) of La Haye-De-Routot.  The forest's western edge is bordered by the A131 autoroute.

History

During the Ancient Roman period, the remainder of the primary forests were cleared (as deforestation had already most likely begun during the Neolithic Period in order to build large domains consisting of several farms a linked to new cities which were growing along the banks of the Seine, along with a new palace named le palais d'Arelaune.

At the entrance of the forest on the other side of the Seine, the Fontenelle Abbey was constructed during the reign of Clovis II, which marked the beginning of evangelicalism in the area.  Later, during the reign of Thierry III, Condède, a Breton recluse saint moved to an island by the forest where he lived for fifteen years, attracting a number of pilgrims who continued to come even after his death to visit his tomb.

Forests of France
Geography of Normandy
Tourist attractions in Normandy